Giuseppe "Pino" Orioli (1884–1942) was a Florentine bookseller best known for privately publishing the unexpurgated first edition of Lady Chatterley's Lover and for his long association with Norman Douglas.

Giuseppe Orioli was born in 1884 in Alfonsine, the son of a shopkeeper. He moved to Florence to work in a barber shop when he was 14 years old.  He later served in the military and lived in Paris and London for some time after leaving the military and before returning to Florence. In Florence he established a small shop that sold antique books.

Orioli's relationship with Norman Douglas began in Florence after Douglas settled there in 1922. Orioli undertook the private publication of many of Douglas' subsequent writings. Some of those and a number of previously unpublished works by other English authors such as Richard Aldington, D. H. Lawrence and William Somerset Maugham, were published in Orioli's Lungarno book series.

D.H. Lawrence had sought to have Lady Chatterley's Lover published conventionally by his publishers in England and the United States, but they were reluctant to undertake its publication because of its explicit sexual content. To circumvent censorship, Norman Douglas urged Lawrence to have the book published privately in Florence, and is believed to have introduced him to Orioli. In March 1928, Orioli and Lawrence took Lawrence's unexpurgated typescript to a Florence printing shop where type was set by hand by Italian workers who did not know any English, resulting in numerous errors in the typesetting. After several delays, including the time required for extensive proofreading by Lawrence, about 1000 copies of the novel were released in July 1928.

Orioli and Douglas traveled extensively together and were so close that they were known to their friends by the name "Pinorman", a portmanteau word combining Orioli's nickname "Pino" with Douglas' given name of "Norman". Together they wrote Venus in the Kitchen, a collection of aphrodisiac recipes that was published in 1952 under the pseudonym Pilaff Bey. Orioli also wrote two other books, Adventures of a Bookseller and Moving Along: Just a Diary. In his book Pinorman, Richard Aldington writes, "Pino did know English well and spoke it fluently, though with certain mistakes which gave it a peculiar flavour. And he was perfectly capable of writing those [two] books himself, except that verbal correction would have been needed". Aldington then adds that Norman Douglas, rather than making corrections to the two books, "rewrote Pino's books, and spoiled them, by taking out the special quality which was Pino and substituting his own much less amusing mannerisms".

Orioli died in 1942 in Lisbon, where he is buried.

References

Further reading
Richard Aldington (1954), Pinorman: Personal Recollections of Norman Douglas, Pino Orioli and Charles Prentice, William Heinemann Ltd.
Mark Holloway (1976), Norman Douglas: A Biography, Martin Secker & Warburg Ltd. .
G. Orioli (1938), Adventures of a Bookseller, Robert M. McBride & Co.
G. Orioli (1934), Moving Along: Just a Diary, Chatto & Windus.
G. Orioli (1974), Some Letters of Pino Orioli to Mrs Gordon Crotch, The Tragara Press, Edinburgh.

External links
Charles Prentice was a publisher.
Douglas, Norman, and Charles Prentice at Betti's restaurant in Florence, Italy (photos)

1884 births
1942 deaths
Italian book publishers (people)
People from the Province of Ravenna